The College of Engineering at Sudan University of Science and Technology was founded in 1975.

History 
The college was founded in 1975 after merging six different independent institutes.
 Institute of Technical Teachers
 Institute of Technicians for Civil Engineering and Architecture
 Institute of Technicians for Mechanical and Electrical Engineering
 Institute of Textile Technicians
 Institute of Surveying Technicians
 Institute of Laboratory Technicians
These institutes became departments of the college, which was called the College of Engineering and Scientific Studies at that time.

Offered Degrees 
The college directly offers 24 BEng and BTech bachelor degrees with honors. 
 Engineering Diploma: Undergraduate course usually can be earned in two to three years (four or six semesters).
 Master of Science
 Doctoral Degrees

Schools and Departments

School of Survey Engineering
 Department of Geodesy
 Department of Remote Sensing
 Department of Geographical Information Systems

School of Civil Engineering 
 Department of Transportation Engineering

School of Electrical and Nuclear Engineering 
 Department of Control Engineering 
 Department of Power and Machines Engineering 
 Department of Nuclear Engineering

School of Electronics Engineering 
 Department of Communication Engineering
 Department of Computer Engineering
 Department of Industrial Electronics

School of Mechanical Engineering
 Department of Manufacturing Engineering 
 Department of Power Engineering

Department of Biomedical Engineering

Department of Aviation Engineering

References

External links 
 Sudan University website
 College of Engineering Website
 Sudan Ministry of Higher education

Sudan University of Science and Technology